Lampadius is a German surname. Notable people with the surname include:

Jakob Lampadius (1593–1649), German expert in constitutional law, politician and diplomat
Johann Lampadius (1569–1621), German Protestant Theologian and Professor of theology and history
Stefan Lampadius (born 1976), German actor and filmmaker
Wilhelm August Lampadius (1772–1842), German metallurgist, chemist and agronomist

German-language surnames
de:Lampadius
fr:Lampadius
zh-min-nan:Lampadius